The  UK Schmidt Telescope (UKST) is a 1.24 metre Schmidt telescope operated by the Australian Astronomical Observatory (formerly the Anglo-Australian Observatory); it is located adjacent to the 3.9 metre Anglo-Australian Telescope at Siding Spring Observatory, Australia. It is very similar to the Samuel Oschin telescope in California. The telescope can detect objects down to magnitude 21 after an hour of exposure on photographic plates.

It was originally built and operated by the United Kingdom, starting from 1973, and was merged with the former Anglo-Australian Observatory in 1988.  It has been wholly operated by Australia since the UK withdrew from the AAO in 2010  (though the name is unchanged).

The UKST is a Schmidt camera, with a design based on the Oschin Schmidt Telescope. It is a survey telescope with a 6° by 6° field of view, originally imaged onto a 35 cm square glass photographic plate, and was the primary source of optical survey data in the southern sky from the 1970s to after 2000. The original sky survey plates were digitally scanned by the Space Telescope Science Institute to create the Guide Star Catalog for the Hubble Space Telescope, and the Digitized Sky Survey.

Although the UKST was originally used to take photographs of the sky, traditional photographic glass (and film) became largely superseded by large electronic CCD detectors in the late 1990s, and after 2000 the UKST was used mostly for multi-object spectroscopy with the 6 degree Field (6dF) instrument. 6dF uses a robot to position up to 150 optical fibres on a metal plate mounted at the focal plane of the UKST, which then carry light from the targets to a spectrograph which sits on the floor of the dome. The 6dF Galaxy Survey (6dFGS), a redshift survey of 120,000 infrared-selected galaxies was completed in 2005, and from 2003–2013 the UKST then carried out the RAdial Velocity Experiment (RAVE) to measure the radial velocities and metallicities of around to 0.5 million stars in the Milky Way Galaxy.

Two new spectroscopic surveys called TAIPAN and Funnelweb are planned post-2015.

See also 
 Malcolm Hartley
 Palomar Observatory
 Space Telescope Science Institute
 List of telescopes of Australia

References

External links 
 Australian Astronomical Observatory UK Schmidt Telescope homepage
 Guide Star Catalog
 Digitized Sky Survey
 6dF Galaxy Survey
 RAVE Survey
 The Taipan Galaxy Survey
 The FunnelWeb Survey

Optical telescopes
Siding Spring Observatory
1973 establishments in Australia